Siderastreidae  is a family of reef building stony corals. Members of the family include symbiotic algae called Zooxanthellae in their tissues which help provide their energy requirements.

Description
Members of this family are colonial, hermatypic (reef-building) corals. The corals vary in form and include massive, thickly encrusting, columnar, and irregular forms. The corallites are linked by flowing septa that have granular margins and that are fused in the centre to give fan-shaped or star-shaped groupings. The corallites do not project from the surface of the coral and have ill-defined walls formed from thickened septa.

Genera
The World Register of Marine Species includes the following genera in the family:

 †Pironastraea d'Achiardi, 1875 
 †Pironastraea indica Duncan, 1880  
 Pseudosiderastrea Yabe & Sugiyama, 1935
 Pseudosiderastrea formosa Pichon, Chuang & Chen, 2012
 Pseudosiderastrea tayami Yabe & Sugiyama, 1935
 Siderastrea de Blainville, 1830 – starlet corals
 †Siderastrea grandis Duncan, 1863
 †Siderastrea radcliffi Faustino, 1931
 Siderastrea radians (Pallas, 1766) – lesser starlet coral or shallow-water starlet coral
 Siderastrea savignyana Milne Edwards & Haime, 1850
 Siderastrea siderea (Ellis & Solander, 1768) – massive starlet coral or round starlet coral
 Siderastrea stellata Verrill, 1868

References

 
Cnidarian families
Taxa named by T. Wayland Vaughan
Taxa named by Bertram Whittier Wells